Never Alone is the third studio album by Christian singer Amy Grant, released in 1980 through Myrrh Records.

By this point in her life, Grant had entered her second year at Furman University and developed a budding relationship with studio songwriter and future husband Gary Chapman. The three songs from the album that they co-wrote obscurely describe their on-again, off-again dating relationship. Although Never Alone was not as popular as its predecessor, the 1979 album My Father's Eyes, it still managed to score a Top Ten Christian hit in "Look What Has Happened to Me". 

The album is excluded from Grant's 2007 digital box set The Storyteller Collection, which encompasses all of Grant's non-Christmas studio albums from her 1977 self-titled debut to Simple Things (2003). Legacy... Hymns and Faith (2002) and Rock of Ages... Hymns and Faith (2005), were the other studio albums not included at the time of the box set's release. Never Alone's omission from the box set may also reaffirm the album's low popularity.

Track listing

Personnel 
 Amy Grant – lead vocals
 Larry Muhoberac – acoustic piano (1, 3, 9, 10)
 Shane Keister – string arrangements (1, 7), synthesizers (2, 3, 11), acoustic piano (2, 6, 7)
 Thomas Cain – backing vocals (3), acoustic piano (5)
 Trantham Whitley – keyboards (4)
 Clayton Ivey – Fender Rhodes (5)
 Jerry Roberts – accordion (6)
 Bruce Dees – backing vocals (1, 3, 5, 9), electric guitar (5)
 Tim May – electric guitar (1, 3, 9, 10)
 Billy Joe Walker Jr. – electric guitar (1, 3, 9, 10), acoustic guitar (4, 11)
 Pete Bordonali – electric guitar (2, 3, 7), classical guitar (8)
 Johnny Christopher – acoustic guitar (2, 4)
 Jimmy Capps – acoustic guitar (4)
 David Hungate – bass (1, 3, 9, 10)
 Jack Williams – bass (2, 7)
 Joe Schmee – bass (4, 11)
 Bob Wray – bass (5)
 Paul Leim – drums (1, 3, 9, 10)
 Clay Caire – drums (2, 7)
 Roger Clark – drums (5)
 Jimmy Maelen – percussion (1)
 Fred Petry – percussion (3, 4)
 Farrell Morris – percussion (4, 7), bass marimba (12)
 Mark Morris – percussion (12)
 Denis Solee – flute (1, 7, 11), saxophone (1, 7), lyricon (8)
 Cindy Reynolds – harp (7)
 Lewis Del Gatto – horns (9)
 John Darnall – string arrangements (2)
 Ronn Huff – string arrangements (3, 8)
 Don Hart – horn arrangements (5)
 Greg Gordon – backing vocals (1, 9)
 Steve Brantley – backing vocals (3)
 Diana DeWitt – backing vocals (3, 6, 10, 12)
 Brown Bannister – backing vocals (5)
 Patti Leatherwood – backing vocals (5)
 Belinda West – backing vocals (5)
 Gary Chapman – backing vocals (6)
 Gary Pigg – backing vocals (6, 10, 12)

Production 
 Brown Bannister – producer, mixing 
 Michael Blanton – executive producer
 Jimmy Birch – engineer, mixing 
 Jack Joseph Puig – engineer
 Glenn Meadows – mastering at Masterfonics (Nashville, Tennessee)
 Michael Harris – design
 Mike Borum – photography

Charts

Weekly charts

End of year charts

References

Amy Grant albums
1980 albums
Albums produced by Brown Bannister
Myrrh Records albums